Merdeka Bridge may refer to the following bridges:

 , a bridge in Indonesia
 Merdeka Bridge, Malaysia
 Merdeka Bridge, Singapore